Stephen II Lackfi (died 27 February 1397 in Križevci) was Ban of Croatia, Palatine of Hungary and the Voivode of Transylvania from the Lackfi family. He was murdered at the Bloody Sabor of Križevci by the followers of king Sigismund. His estates were confiscated by the crown and the bulk of it, in the region of Međimurje, sold to the king's father-in-law Hermann of Celje.

References

External links
Monument to Stephen Lackfy in the Hungarian town of Keszthely

14th-century Hungarian people
14th-century Croatian people
1397 deaths
Palatines of Hungary
Voivodes of Transylvania
Bans of Croatia
History of Čakovec
Counts of the Székelys
Assassinated nobility
Assassinated Hungarian people
Stephen 02